Mirnoye is a rural locality (a selo) in Kizlyarsky Selsoviet, Kizlyarsky District, Republic of Dagestan, Russia. The population was 149 as of 2010.

Geography 
Mirnoye is located 69 km northeast of Kizlyar (the district's administrative centre) by road. Burunnyy and Aga-Batyr are the nearest rural localities.

Nationalities 
Tsakhurs, Avars and Russians live there.

References 

Rural localities in Kizlyarsky District